Chimaerocestidae is a family of flatworms belonging to the order Tetraphyllidea. The family consists of only one genus: Chimaerocestos Williams & Bray, 1984.

References

Platyhelminthes